Astrothelium corallinum is a species of corticolous (bark-dwelling), crustose lichen in the family Trypetheliaceae. Found in Guyana, it was formally described as a new species in 2016 by André Aptroot. The whitish parts of the pseudostromata will fluoresce yellow when lit with a long-wavelength UV light; this is due to the presence of lichexanthone, a lichen product. The thallus, however, does not contain lichexanthone, which distinguishes it from the similar species A. ochroleucoides.

References

corallinum
Lichen species
Lichens described in 2016
Lichens of Guyana
Taxa named by André Aptroot